James Ennis (born July 10, 1967) is a Canadian former professional ice hockey defenceman who played in the National Hockey League for the Edmonton Oilers. 

Born in Sherwood Park, Alberta, Ennis played collegiate hockey for Boston University and was drafted by the Edmonton Oilers in the sixth round of the 1986 NHL Entry Draft. He played in five games for the Oilers in the 1987–88 season and scored a goal, but spent most of his rookie year in their minor league affiliate Nova Scotia Oilers. Prior to the 1989–90 NHL season, he was traded to the Hartford Whalers for Norm Maciver, and spent that season playing for the Whalers' farm club in Binghamton. He retired in 1990.

Career statistics

Regular season and playoffs

References

1967 births
Living people
Binghamton Whalers players
Boston University Terriers men's ice hockey players
Canadian ice hockey defencemen
Cape Breton Oilers players
Edmonton Oilers draft picks
Edmonton Oilers players
Nova Scotia Oilers players
People from Strathcona County